The Plot Against America is an American alternate history drama television miniseries created and written by David Simon and Ed Burns, based on the 2004 novel of the same name by Philip Roth, that aired on HBO from March 16, 2020, to April 20, 2020.

Premise
The Plot Against America imagines an alternate American history told through the eyes of a working-class Jewish family in Newark, New Jersey, as they watch the political rise of Charles Lindbergh, an aviator-hero and xenophobic populist, who becomes president and turns the nation toward fascism."

Production
HBO announced on November 8, 2018, that it had ordered a six-episode miniseries based on Philip Roth's novel The Plot Against America to be written by David Simon and Ed Burns and executive produced by Simon, Burns, and Roth, alongside Joe Roth, Jeff Kirschenbaum, Nina Noble, Megan Ellison, Sue Naegle, Susan Goldberg, and Dennis Stratton. Production companies involved with the series include Annapurna Pictures and Blown Deadline Productions. In April 2019, Winona Ryder, Zoe Kazan, Morgan Spector, John Turturro, Anthony Boyle, Azhy Robertson, and Caleb Malis joined the cast of the series.

"The Road is Open Again", written in 1933 for Franklin D. Roosevelt's National Recovery Administration, was used for the opening theme song, performed by actor Michael Kostroff.

Simon had read the novel in 2004, but thought it politically irrelevant; though approached by Tom Rothman in 2013 to adapt it for television, he declined. He decided to take on the project in the aftermath of the 2016 US election, in which Donald Trump was elected US President, saying that Roth's novel had proven "perversely...allegorical," and approaching his longtime collaborator Ed Burns, with whom he had worked on The Wire and Generation Kill, to co-write. Events such as the Unite the Right rally in Charlottesville influenced the adaptation.

A point of concern was the show's ending, about which Simon approached Roth, and to which Roth provided no solution. Simon and Burns chose a more ambiguous conclusion than the novel's, though one more directly involving characters in ending the Lindbergh administration, and expanded the perspective beyond just the novel's narrator, Philip. Roth himself expressed potential concerns, suggesting that the family name be changed to Weiss (Simon chose Levin), that the family be assimilated Americans, and for the production team to not "confuse" Lindbergh for Trump.

Filming

Filming took place in 2019 at a number of locations, including:
 Jersey City at Temple Beth-El and in the Greenville shopping district in May
 Downtown Paterson in May
 Newark in June
 Cranford, New Jersey on August 29–30
 New York City in May and June
 Baltimore, on June 13–14, including on the deck of the SS John W. Brown, a WWII Liberty ship docked at the Canton Dock
 Washington, D.C. on June 14–16

Cast and characters

Main

 Morgan Spector as Herman Levin, an insurance agent with a promising career, and an opinionated New Deal socialist
 Zoe Kazan as Elizabeth "Bess" Levin, Herman's wife and stay-at-home mother
 Winona Ryder as Evelyn Finkel, Bess's older, unmarried, independently minded sister
 John Turturro as Rabbi Lionel Bengelsdorf, a charismatic leader and supporter of Charles Lindbergh, and Evelyn's lover
 Anthony Boyle as Alvin Levin, Herman's orphaned, young-adult nephew, who lives with him
 Michael Kostroff as Shepsie Tirchwell, Herman's friend, who manages a newsreel theater and discusses politics with Herman
 David Krumholtz as Monty Levin, Herman's older brother, a successful grocery supplier
 Azhy Robertson as Philip Levin, the Levins' 10-year-old son
 Caleb Malis as Sanford "Sandy" Levin, their rebellious teenaged son, who is a talented artist
 Jacob Laval as Seldon Wishnow, a shy and awkward boy who lives in the downstairs section of the house, who is eventually fostered  by the Levins

Recurring
 Ben Cole as Brigadier General Charles Lindbergh, a fictionalized portrayal of Lindbergh, as a xenophobic populist who runs for President on a ticket of opposition to US involvement in the war
 Caroline Kaplan as Anne Morrow Lindbergh
 Billy Carter as Walter Winchell
 Ed Moran as Henry Ford
 Daniel O'Shea as Burton K. Wheeler
 Orest Ludwig as Joachim von Ribbentrop
 Kristen Sieh as Selma Wishnow
 Lee Tergesen as Agent Don McCorkle
 Graydon Yosowitz as Earl Axman, Philip's delinquent school friend
 Steven Maier as Shushy Margulis
 Zach McNally as Billy Murphy

Episodes

Broadcasting and streaming
In New Zealand, the series is distributed by Neon streaming service and SkyGo, which are owned by satellite television company Sky Network.

Reception
The miniseries has received critical acclaim. On Rotten Tomatoes, it has an approval rating of 87% with an average rating of 8.2/10, based on 76 reviews. The website's critical consensus reads, "A cautionary tale that hits close to home, The Plot Against Americas handsomely realized revisionist history is disturbingly relevant, making it difficult, but essential viewing." On Metacritic, it has a weighted average score of 82 out of 100, based on 37 critics, indicating "universal acclaim".

Meghan O'Keefe of Decider wrote that it "is a bleak watch, but full of spectacular performances and masterful craftsmanship." Darren Franich of Entertainment Weekly stated that "Simon and Burns craft their story with remarkable texture" and that "the final hour is one of the most breathtakingly tense episodes of television I've ever seen, carrying you on a dark journey through a country on fire."

James Poniewozik wrote in The New York Times that the show was "more than a thought exercise in 'Here’s what might have happened then, and thank God it didn’t.' Instead, it’s: 'Here’s what could happen at any time. Here’s what does happen, all the time. Why should we think we’re so special?'," adding that the novel was "too feel-good" in comparison.

Accolades

References

External links
 
 

2020s American drama television miniseries
2020 American television series debuts
2020 American television series endings
English-language television shows
HBO original programming
Television shows filmed in New Jersey
Television shows set in New Jersey
Television shows based on American novels
Culture of Newark, New Jersey
Television series about World War II alternate histories
Television series set in the 1940s
Cultural depictions of Charles Lindbergh
Anti-fascist works
Television series about Nazism
Fascism in the United States
Newark, New Jersey in fiction